Way Out Where is an album by The Verlaines. Recorded at NRG Recording Studios in North Hollywood, Los Angeles, it was released in 1993 by Slash Records.

Track listing
All songs written by Graeme Downes.
"Mission of Love" – 4:02
"I Stare Out..." – 3:25
"This Valentine" – 4:41
"Blanket Over the Sky" – 3:20
"Cathedrals Under the Sea" – 3:24
"Aches in Whisper" – 3:47
"Way Out Where" – 3:32
"Lucky in My Dreams" – 4:03
"Black Wings" – 3:15
"Stay Gone" – 4:10
"Incarceration" – 3:37
"Dirge" – 4:07

References

The Verlaines albums
1993 albums
Slash Records albums